Stanisław Skalski,  (27 November 1915 – 12 November 2004) was a Polish aviator and fighter ace who served with the Polish Air Force and British Royal Air Force during the Second World War. Skalski was the top Polish fighter ace of the war and chronologically the first Allied fighter ace of the war, credited, according to the Bajan's list, with 18 11/12 victories and two probable. Some sources, including Skalski himself, give a number of 22 11/12 victories. 

He returned to Poland after the war but was imprisoned by the communist authorities under the pretext that he was a spy for Great Britain. While in arrest he was tortured and then, in a show trial, sentenced to death on April 7, 1950. Skalski refused to ask for clemency but after his mother's intervention with the president of communist Poland, Boleslaw Bierut his sentence was commuted to life imprisonment. He remained in prison until 1956 when a court overturned the previous verdict. After the "Polish October" and subsequent liberalization and end of Stalinist terror, he was rehabilitated and rejoined the Polish armed forces. In 1972 he was moved to inactive service and in 1988, on the cusp of fall of communism in Poland he was promoted to the rank of brigadier general.

Early life and career
Stanisław Skalski was born on 27 November 1915 in Kodyma in Podolia Governorate, Russian Empire (now in Ukraine). After completing Pilot Training School in 1938, Skalski was ordered to the 142nd Fighter Squadron in Toruń (142 eskadra "Toruńska"). On 1 September 1939 he attacked a German Henschel Hs 126 reconnaissance aircraft, which was eventually shot down by Marian Pisarek. Skalski then landed next to it, helped to bandage wounded crew members and arranged for them to be taken to a military hospital.
The following day, nine PZL P-11s of the 142 Squadron, led by Major Lesnievski, intercepted two formations of Dornier Do 217 on River Vistula. Attacking head on, the Polish pilots managed to shoot down seven twin-engined bombers, two of them credited to Skalski.
By 16 September Skalski reached flying ace status, claiming a total of six German aircraft and making him the first Allied air ace of the Second World War.

Skalski's claims consisted of one Junkers Ju 86, two Dornier Do 17, one Junkers Ju 87, two Hs 126s and one Hs 126 shared (official list credits him with four aircraft: two Do 17s, one Hs 126, one Ju 87 and one Hs 126 shared). Soon after he fled the country with other Polish pilots to Romania, and from there via Beirut to France and after went on to fight with the Royal Air Force in the Battle of Britain.

RAF service

In August 1940, Pilot Officer Skalski joined No. 501 Squadron RAF. From 30 August to 2 September 1940 he shot down a He 111 bomber and three Messerschmitt Bf 109s. On 5 September Skalski himself was shot down. Skalski bailed out with severe burns, and was hospitalized for six weeks. He returned to his unit in late October 1940. During the Battle of Britain, he was credited with four planes shot down and one shared.

In March 1941 Skalski was assigned to No. 306 (Polish) Squadron RAF, flying in Circus sorties over France. On 15 August 1941 he crashed while landing Spitfire W3170 after returning from a mission. On 1 March 1942, he became a flight commander in No. 316 (Polish) Squadron RAF. On 29 April 1942 Flight Lieutenant Skalski was made Commanding Officer of the No. 317 (Polish) Squadron RAF for five months. From November 1942 he was an instructor with No. 58 Operation Training Unit.

In October 1942 Skalski was given command of the Polish Fighting Team (PFT), or so called "Cyrk Skalskiego" (Skalski's Circus) – a special flight consisting of fifteen experienced Polish fighter pilot volunteers. The Poles arrived at Bu Grara airfield, west of Tripoli in March 1943 and attached to No. 145 Squadron RAF. The PFT took part in actions in Tripolitania and in Sicily. On 6 May 1943 the "Skalski Circus" fought its last battle. The unit was disbanded after the conclusion of the North African campaign. During its two months on operations, the Polish pilots had claimed a total of 26 German and Italian aircraft shot down. Skalski scored four aircraft, and Pilot Officer Eugeniusz Horbaczewski claimed five confirmed victories.

Skalski then became commander of No. 601 (County of London) Squadron, the first Pole to command an RAF squadron. He then took part in the invasion of Sicily and invasion of Italy. From December 1943 to April 1944 Wing Commander Skalski commanded No. 131 Polish Fighter Wing. On 4 April 1944 he was appointed commander of No. 133 Polish Fighter Wing, flying the Mustang Mk III. On 24 June 1944 Skalski scored two air victories over Rouen.

Skalski left for a tour of duty in the US in September 1944, returning in February 1945 to a staff position at No. 11 Group.

Return to Poland and arrest

After the war Skalski returned to Poland in 1947 and joined the Air Force of the Polish Army. In 1948 however he was arrested under the false charge of espionage. Sentenced to death, he spent three years awaiting the execution, after which his sentence was changed to life imprisonment in Wronki Prison.

After the end of Stalinism in Poland, in 1956 he was released, rehabilitated, and allowed to join the military. He served at various posts in the Headquarters of the Polish Air Force. He wrote memoires of the 1939 campaign Czarne krzyże nad Polską ("Black crosses over Poland", 1957). On 20 May 1968 he was nominated the secretary general of the Aeroklub Polski and on 10 April 1972 he retired. On 15 September 1988 he was promoted to the rank of brigadier general. In 1990 he met with the German pilot he had rescued on the first day of the war.

Stanisław Skalski died in Warsaw on 12 November 2004.

Awards
 Virtuti Militari, Golden Cross
 Virtuti Militari, Silver Cross  
 Cross of Valour (Poland), four times 
 Order of Polonia Restituta, Knight's Cross 
 Order of the Cross of Grunwald, 3rd class
 Distinguished Service Order
 
Distinguished Flying Cross (United Kingdom) and two bars 
 1939-1945 Star with Battle of Britain clasp 
 Italy Star

References

Notes

Bibliography

 Cynk, Jerzy Bogdam. Polskie lotnictwo myśliwskie w boju wrześniowym (in Polish). Gdańsk, Poland: AJ-Press, 2000.
 Cynk, Jerzy Bogdam. Polskie Siły Powietrzne w wojnie tom 1: 1939–43 (Polish Air Force in War pt. 1: 1939–43) (in Polish). Gdańsk, Poland: AJ-Press, 2001. (Updated and revised edition of The Polish Air Force at War: The Official History, Vol.2 1939–1943. Atglen, PA: Schiffer Books, 1998. .)
 Cynk, Jerzy Bogdam. Polskie Siły Powietrzne w wojnie tom 2: 1943–45 (Polish Air Force in War pt. 2: 1943–45) (In Polish). Gdańsk, Poland: AJ-Press, 2002. (Updated and revised edition of The Polish Air Force at War: The Official History, Vol.2 1943–1945. Atglen, PA: Schiffer Books, 1998. .)
 Grabowski, Franciszek. Gen. bryg. pil. Stanisław Skalski. in: "Militaria i Fakty" 2/2005 (Polish)
 Grabowski, Franciszek. Stanisław Skalski. Sandomierz, Poland/Redbourn, UK: Mushroom Model Publications, 2007. .
 Gretzyngier, Robert. Poles in Defence of Britain: A Day-by-day Chronology of Polish Day and Night Fighter Pilot Operations – July 1940 – June 1941. London: Grub Street, 2005. .
 Jackson, Robert. Fighter! The Story of Air Combat 1936-1945. London, Artur Barker Limited. 1979. .
 Ochabska, Katarzyna. Stanisław Skalski. Gliwice, 2007.
 Skalski, Stanisław. Czarne krzyże nad Polską (in Polish). Warszawa, Poland, 1957 (New edition: De Facto, 2006).

Further reading

 Cynk, Jerzy Bogdam. History of the Polish Air Force 1918–1968. UK: Osprey Publications, 1972.
 Koniarek, Dr. Jan. Polish Air Force 1939–1945. Carrollton, TX: Squadron/Signal Publications, Inc.,1994. .
 Kornicki, Franciszek. Polish Air Force- Chronicle of Main Events. UK: Polish Air Force Association of Great Britain, 1993.
 Tadeusz Jerzy Krzystek, Anna Krzystek: Polskie Siły Powietrzne w Wielkiej Brytanii w latach 1940-1947 łącznie z Pomocniczą Lotniczą Służbą Kobiet (PLSK-WAAF). Sandomierz: Stratus, 2012, p. 516. 
 Lisiewicz, Mieczyslaw (Translated from the Polish by Ann Maitland-Chuwen). Destiny can wait – The Polish Air Force in the Second World War. London: Heinemann, 1949.
 Jerzy Pawlak: Absolwenci Szkoły Orląt: 1925-1939. Warszawa: Retro-Art, 2009, p. 188. 
 Piotr Sikora: Asy polskiego lotnictwa. Warszawa: Oficyna Wydawnicza Alma-Press. 2014, p. 147–157. 
 Zamoyski, Adam. The Forgotten Few: The Polish Air Force in The Second World War. UK: Leo Cooper Ltd., 2004. .
 Józef Zieliński: Asy polskiego lotnictwa. Warszawa: Agencja lotnicza ALTAIR, 1994, p. 8–9. 
 Józef Zieliński: Lotnicy polscy w Bitwie o Wielką Brytanię. Warszawa: Oficyna Wydawnicza MH, 2005, p. 187–189.

External links

 Krajewski, Wojciech. "Generał brygady pilot Stanisław Skalski as polskiego lotnictwa"

1915 births
2004 deaths
People from Odesa Oblast
People from Baltsky Uyezd
Polish People's Army generals
Polish World War II flying aces
Royal Air Force officers
Royal Air Force pilots of World War II
Polish Royal Air Force pilots of World War II
The Few
Knights of the Order of Polonia Restituta
Recipients of the Gold Cross of the Virtuti Militari
Recipients of the Distinguished Flying Cross (United Kingdom)
Recipients of the Order of the Cross of Grunwald, 3rd class
Recipients of the Cross of Valour (Poland)
Companions of the Distinguished Service Order